The 1882 Wakanui by-election was a by-election held on 16 June 1882 in the  electorate during the 8th New Zealand Parliament.

The by-election was caused when the election of the incumbent MP Cathcart Wason in 1881 was declared void.

The by-election was won by Joseph Ivess. He was opposed by Alfred Saunders.

Results
The following table gives the election result:

References

Wakanui 1882
1882 elections in New Zealand
Politics of Canterbury, New Zealand